Hildenborough railway station is on the South Eastern Main Line in England, serving Hildenborough, Kent, and the surrounding villages. Trains calling at the station are operated by Southeastern.

Trains from the station run northbound to Charing Cross via Orpington and southbound to Tunbridge Wells. Trains also run to London Cannon Street and Ashford International during peak times.

Services
All services at Hildenborough are operated by Southeastern using ,  and  EMUs.

The typical off-peak service in trains per hour is:
 1 tph to London Charing Cross
 1 tph to  via 

During the peak hours, the service is increased to 2 tph in each direction and runs between London and Tunbridge Wells.

Accidents and incidents
On 6 July 1970, a freight train was derailed at Hildenborough. The line was blocked for three days.

Transport links
The station is located 1 km from the centre of Hildenborough.

No buses stop directly outside the station although the Go-Coach route 5 and Arriva Southern Counties routes 401 and 402 stop on London Road, approximately 15 minutes walking distance from the  station. These services provide connections to Westerham, Sevenoaks, Tonbridge and Tunbridge Wells.

References

External links
Tonbridge Line Commuters - Hildenborough

Tonbridge and Malling
Railway stations in Kent
DfT Category D stations
Former South Eastern Railway (UK) stations
Railway stations in Great Britain opened in 1868
Railway stations served by Southeastern